Jalingo Airport  renamed Danbaba Danfulani Suntai Airport is an airport serving Jalingo located 10km to the west from the city center, the capital of Taraba State in Nigeria. After a period of intermittent construction, the upgraded airport opened in 2014. Although it was established in 2014, it did not commence commercial service operation till in December, 2015.

Runway length includes a  displaced threshold on the west end.

Airlines and destinations

See also

Transport in Nigeria
List of airports in Nigeria

References

External links
OurAirports - Jalingo
Google Maps - Jalingo
Jalingo Airport

Airports in Nigeria